Giacomo Simoncini (born 30 November 1994) is a Sammarinese politician, sports executive and pharmacist, who served as the Captain Regent of San Marino with Francesco Mussoni from 1 October 2021 to 1 April 2022. At the time of his appointment, he was the youngest state leader in the world, and was the only head of state younger than the age of 30. A member of the Socialist Party, he has been a member of the Grand and General Council for the electoral alliance Noi per la Repubblica since 2019.

Biography
Simoncini was born and grew up in Borgo Maggiore in San Marino. He graduated in pharmacy and obtained the qualification as a teacher of chemistry.

At the age of 18, he enrolled to the Sammarinese Socialist Party, and a year later became a member of the executive board.

Following the political elections in 2019, Simoncini became a Member of the Grand and General Council for electoral alliance We for the Republic and is a member of the Council of XII and of Council Commissions.

He is also a member of the board of directors of the S.S. Murata since 2017 and team manager of the San Marino national futsal team since 2018. At the same time he is a Rotarian and a president of the Rotaract Club of San Marino.

See also
Lists of state leaders by age

References

1994 births
Living people
People from Borgo Maggiore
University of Bologna alumni
Captains Regent of San Marino
Members of the Grand and General Council
Sammarinese Socialist Party politicians
We for the Republic politicians
Sammarinese sports executives and administrators